Lucio Ángel Vallejo Balda  (born Villamediana de Iregua, Logroño, Spain, 12 June 1961) is a Vatican monsignor who was jailed for leaking official documents in the Vatileaks scandal.  The clergyman admitted to passing classified  documents to journalists. He is highest-ranking Vatican official ever to be arrested.    Pope Francis  granted him clemency after he served half of the 18-month jail sentence.

See also

Vatican leaks scandal
Carlo Maria Viganò

References

History of the Roman Curia
Opus Dei members
Spanish Roman Catholic priests
Pontifical University of Salamanca alumni
Pope Benedict XVI
History of the papacy
21st-century Catholicism
Religious scandals
Crime in Vatican City
1961 births
Living people